Equus is a 1977 psychological drama film directed by Sidney Lumet and written by Peter Shaffer, based on his play of the same name. The film stars Richard Burton, Peter Firth, Colin Blakely, Joan Plowright, Eileen Atkins, and Jenny Agutter. The story concerns a psychiatrist treating a teenager who has blinded horses in a stable, attempting to find the root of his horse worship.

Lumet's translation of the acclaimed play to a cinematic version incorporated some realism, in the use of real horses as opposed to human actors, and a graphic portrayal of the blinding. Despite some criticism of this approach, the film received positive reviews, with awards for Burton, Firth and Agutter.

Plot
Hesther Salomon, a magistrate, asks her platonic friend Martin Dysart, a disillusioned psychiatrist who works with disturbed teenagers at a hospital in Hampshire, England, to treat a 17-year-old stable boy named Alan Strang after he blinded six horses with a sickle. With Alan only singing TV commercial jingles, Martin goes to see the boy's parents, the non-religious Frank Strang and his Christian fundamentalist wife Dora. She had taught her son the basics of sex and that God sees all, but the withdrawn Alan replaced his mother's deity with a god he called Equus, incarnated in horses. Frank discloses to Martin that he witnessed Alan late at night in his room, haltered and flagellating himself, as he chanted a series of names in Biblical genealogy-fashion which culminated in the name Equus as he climaxed.

Martin begins winning the respect and confidence of Alan, who shares his earliest memory of a horse from when he was six and a man approached him on a horse named Trojan. Alan imagined the horse spoke to him, and said his true name was Equus, and this was the name of all horses. The man took Alan up on Trojan, which the boy found thrilling, but his parents reacted negatively and injured him taking him off the horse. Martin also meets the stable manager, who reveals Alan secured his job through another employee, Jill. Devastated at the horses' injuries she indirectly caused, Jill has taken medical leave.

Eventually, Alan admits to Martin that he would secretly take horses away from the stables at night to ride them nude, chanting prayers to Equus until he reached orgasm, after which he caressed them lovingly. Martin envies the boy's passionate paganism, in comparison to his own empty life, where he has ceased intimacies with his wife and is plagued by nightmares of ritualistically slaughtering children in Homer's Greece, wearing the Mask of Agamemnon. Given an aspirin serving as a placebo "truth drug", Alan further reveals that one evening Jill tempted him to go to a Swedish pornographic film at a local cinema, where he was shocked to see his father, who forced him to leave the cinema. After Alan went back with Jill to the stables, she stripped and offered him sex but he was unable to perform and, although she was sympathetic, told her to leave. Naked, and tormented that Equus sees all and is a jealous god, he blinded the horses.

Martin is left troubled by the fact that he can treat Alan to take away his pain but in the process will deprive the boy of his passion, leaving him as emotionally neutered as Martin himself.

Cast

Production

Development
Director Sidney Lumet saw the play Equus when it was first performed in London between 1973 and 1975, and also saw productions with Anthony Perkins and Richard Burton. Lumet found that Perkins' performance was excellent, but felt the stage productions failed to capture the conflict of the character Martin Dysart, which he believed was meant to represent writer Peter Shaffer's inner turmoil.

Shaffer and Lumet spent more than one year preparing the screenplay before filming began. Much of the dialogue in Shaffer's play is preserved, accurately, in the screenplay.

Marlon Brando and Jack Nicholson were considered for the part of Dysart in the film version. However, Burton's stage performance won over audiences, despite concerns about his alcoholism.

Filming
In stage productions, the horses are portrayed by human actors, often heavily built, athletic men wearing tribal-style masks. Lumet did not believe this could adequately be done in a film version, concluding a degree of realism was required, "because the reality he [Alan] was being watched in was going to create the dilemma within him". For horse-related stunts, the filmmakers consulted Yakima Canutt, who had previously worked on almost all of John Wayne's early western films. The horse riding and blinding scenes were shot initially in natural light before moving to unrealistic lighting, to capture conflicting Apollonian and Dionysian world views. With cinematographer Oswald Morris and production designer Tony Walton, Lumet developed a complex colour scheme avoiding easily identifiable colours, preferring to combine colours to emphasise duality.

The scene where Firth rides the horse nude was filmed in one take, in an uninterrupted shot lasting four and a half minutes. Whereas the blinding scene was done in pantomime on stage, Lumet opted to graphically display it to convey the horror. Much of the footage shot depicted the horses' heads morphing into faces of Jesus, Dora Strang and Frank Strang, and a glimpse of a Balinese dagger. However, Lumet decided this was unsubtle and cut much of this, only keeping the dagger to portray ancient impulses.

Despite being a British and American production set in Hampshire, England, filming took place entirely in and around Ontario, Canada. The scenes in the stable and Alan's room were filmed in the Toronto International Film Studio in Kleinburg, while downtown Hampshire was doubled with Georgetown and Halton Hills. The Strang family house was a real house located in the Toronto suburb of Riverdale. The film was produced during the height of the "tax shelter era" of Canadian filmmaking, in which foreign producers flocked to the country in order to take advantage of the Capital Cost Allowance which allowed investors to deduct up to a 100% of a film's budget provided it met certain requirements. That, combined with the value of the Canadian dollar and abundance of cheaper crew and locations than those found abroad, led to a boom period in Canadian filmmaking.

Reception

Critical reception

Lumet acknowledged that the film was "very vulnerable to attack", and critics were bound to ask why a film was needed when the play was "perfect", but initial reviews were "respectful". Roger Ebert gave the film two and a half stars, arguing the realism in actual horses and their blinding, "strangely enough, get in the way of the play's own reality: the obsession that the two characters come to share"; however, Ebert complimented Burton and Firth on their performances. Vincent Canby, chief critic for The New York Times, wrote that he preferred the theatricality of the stage production, but "Now, after seeing Sidney Lumet's comparatively realistic film version, it's possible to appreciate Mr. Shaffer's text for what it is— an extraordinarily skillful, passionate inquiry into the entire Freudian method". Canby also found the movie's realism excessive, and said that "the movie exhausts us with information", specifically citing the scene where Alan rides a horse bareback as giving the viewers "anticlimactic detail". Canby also concluded "This is the best Burton performance since Who's Afraid of Virginia Woolf?" Molly Haskell's review in New York remarked that the film came "not a moment too soon" for fans of the play, and that Burton was eloquent, Firth "brings out the ugly and unpleasant qualities of the boy", while Jenny Agutter "is rudely treated as the girl who, in another of those preposterous conventions of sixties movies, offers herself nude to the sensitive youth only to have him spurn her". Jesse Kornbluth, writing for Texas Monthly, called the film "an unqualified success", even though he felt the play was only of interest to "middle-brow" audiences.

English Professor James M. Welsh felt using real horses in the film was understandable, but argued the outdoor scenes infringed on the "abstract theatrical design" that gave the play its creativity. Welsh also felt the explicit blinding was "potentially repulsive", and "much of the spirit of the play is lost as a consequence".

The film received generally positive reviews, currently holding a 68% rating on Rotten Tomatoes, based on 22 reviews. In 2005, the American Film Institute nominated Richard Rodney Bennett's music for AFI's 100 Years of Film Scores.

Accolades

References

Bibliography

External links
 
 
 

1977 films
1977 drama films
British drama films
American drama films
1970s English-language films
Films directed by Sidney Lumet
Films about horses
Films about psychiatry
Films based on plays by Peter Shaffer
Films set in Hampshire
Films shot in Ontario
British independent films
United Artists films
Films featuring a Best Drama Actor Golden Globe winning performance
Films featuring a Best Supporting Actor Golden Globe winning performance
American independent films
Psychotherapy in fiction
Films produced by Elliott Kastner
1977 independent films
1970s American films
1970s British films